Aco is a masculine given name, often a short form (hypocorism) of Aleksandar, which may refer to:

 Aleksandar Aco Apolonio (died 2001), first and only president of the self-proclaimed Dubrovnik Republic (1991–1992)
 Aleksandar Aco Đukanović, controversial Montenegrin businessman
 Aco Jonovski (born 1980), Macedonian handball player
 Aco Karamanov (1927–1944), Macedonian poet and partisan
 Aco Mavec (1929–1982), Slovene painter
 Aleksandar Aco Pejović (born 1972), Serbian pop-folk singer
 Aleksandar Petrović (basketball, born February 1959), Croatian basketball coach and former player
 Aleksandar Petrović (basketball, born October 1959) (1959–2014), Serbian basketball coach
 Aco Šopov (1923–1982), Macedonian poet
 Aco Stojkov (born 1983), Macedonian footballer

Masculine given names
Montenegrin masculine given names
Hypocorisms